The Canton of Valence is one of the 15 cantons of the Tarn-et-Garonne department, in southern France. At the French canton reorganisation which came into effect in March 2015, the canton was expanded from 11 to 17 communes:

 Boudou
 Bourg-de-Visa
 Brassac
 Castelsagrat
 Espalais
 Gasques
 Golfech
 Goudourville
 Lamagistère
 Montjoi
 Perville
 Pommevic
 Saint-Clair
 Saint-Nazaire-de-Valentane
 Saint-Paul-d'Espis
 Saint-Vincent-Lespinasse
 Valence

References

Valence